The Waco Tribune-Herald is an American daily newspaper serving Waco, Texas, and vicinity.

Background
The newspaper has its roots in five predecessors, beginning with the Waco Evening Telephone in 1892. The Tribune-Herald took its current identity when E.S. Fentress and Charles Marsh, who owned the Waco News-Tribune, bought the Waco Times-Herald. That purchase was the beginning of Newspapers, Inc., a chain that eventually owned 13 newspapers.

The newspapers stayed in the Fentress family until 1976, when they were sold to Cox Newspapers, which continued to own the chain until 2009, when Waco businessman Clifton Robinson bought the paper. In 2012, Robinson sold the newspaper to Berkshire Hathaway.

The Tribune-Herald is best known for a series of stories in February and March 1993 about the Branch Davidian sect  headquartered in a compound in Mount Carmel, near Waco. The series reported that leader Vernon Howell, later known as David Koresh, had turned the group into a cult, engaged in polygamy, abused children living in the compound, and was amassing an arsenal of weapons. The Tribune-Herald had been reporting on a number of issues about the compound in the months before the series. Federal authorities asked managing editor Barbara Elmore to hold off on the series, but she refused, and the first of seven parts was published on February 27, 1993. The Bureau of Alcohol, Tobacco and Firearms was planning a raid on the compound on March 1, with warrants for Koresh and several followers, but the raid was moved up a day in response to the Tribune-Herald series. The raid turned deadly, as the Davidians were tipped off early and were expecting the federal agents. A shootout occurred, leading to a 51-day siege that ended in an attack on the compound, which resulted in its fiery destruction that was seen live by television viewers around the world.

In 2021, the newspaper announced it would move out of its 70-year-old building, which is being bought by the Magnolia brand helmed by Chip and Joanna Gaines, whose Magnolia Market at the Silos attraction is located just a few blocks away. The television personalities plan to make the facility their corporate headquarters in 2022.

Waco Today Magazine
The paper also publishes a monthly lifestyle magazine. Each issue focuses on a specific issue, such as weddings, remodeling, or dining out for the Waco area.

See also

References

External links
WacoTrib.com, the Tribune-Herald web site
Tribune-Herald 1993 series about David Koresh and the Branch Davidian sect

Waco siege
Daily newspapers published in Texas
Waco, Texas
Lee Enterprises publications